Timocrates of Rhodes was a Rhodian Greek sent by the Persian satrap Pharnabazus in 396 or 395 BC to distribute money to Greek city states and foment opposition to Sparta.  He visited Athens, Thebes, Corinth, and Argos.  His encouragement prompted Thebes to provoke Sparta into war, beginning the Corinthian War, which dragged on from 395 to 387 BC.

The primary aim of Timocrates' mission, which he accomplished, was to force the withdrawal of the Spartan king Agesilaus and his army from Ionia.  Timocrates's success in this mission was the basis for the famous statement, recorded by Plutarch, that "a thousand Persian archers had driven [Agesilaus] out of Asia," referring to the archer that was stamped on Persian gold coins.

Notes

References
Fine, John V.A. The Ancient Greeks: A critical history (Harvard University Press, 1983) 
Plutarch, Life of Agesilaus

4th-century BC Rhodians
People of the Corinthian War
Medism
Ambassadors in Greek Antiquity
Ancient Greek emigrants to the Achaemenid Empire